Series 1 of Australian police drama Rush premiered on 2 September 2008 on Network Ten. The series was commissioned paritlally due to the shortage of series caused by the 2007–2008 Writers Guild of America strike. It followed the lives of two teams employed with the prestigious Tactical Response Unit in Victoria, Australia.

The series first pilot was filmed in 2004 and had the working title of Rapid Response, additionally using an old Police Rescue script.

Cast

Regular
 Rodger Corser as Senior Sergeant Lawson Blake
 Callan Mulvey as Sergeant Brendan "Josh" Joshua
 Claire van der Boom as Senior Constable Grace Barry (until episode 11)
 Josef Ber as Sergeant Dominic "Dom" Wales
 Nicole da Silva as Constable Stella Dagostino
 Ashley Zukerman as Constable Michael Sandrelli
 Samuel Johnson as Intelligence Officer Leon Broznic
 Catherine McClements as Inspector Kerry Vincent

Recurring
 Todd MacDonald as Connor Barry
 Kate Jenkinson as Nina Wise
Maia Thomas as Sandrine Wales
Zen Ledden as Brian Marshall
 Adam Zwar as Marty Gero

Episodes 
{| class="wikitable plainrowheaders" style="width: 100%; margin-right: 0;"
|-
! style="background: #E9E9E9; color: #000;"| No. in series
! style="background: #E9E9E9; color: #000;"| No. in season
! style="background: #E9E9E9; color: #000;"| Title
! style="background: #E9E9E9; color: #000;"| 
! style="background: #E9E9E9; color: #000;"| Written by
! style="background: #E9E9E9; color: #000;"| Australian viewers(million)
! style="background: #E9E9E9; color: #000;"| Rank(weekly)
! style="background: #E9E9E9; color: #000;"| Original air date
|- Series 1 Episode 1

|}

DVD Releases 
The entire first series Region 4 DVD was released on 30 July 2009.

References

External links 
 
 
 

2008 Australian television seasons